KRTN (1490 AM) is a radio station  broadcasting an adult contemporary format. It is licensed to Raton, New Mexico, United States. The station is currently owned by Enchanted Air, Inc. and features programming from AP Radio and Jones Radio Network.

References

External links

RTN